Matthew Ashforde is an English actor known for his appearances in EastEnders, Press Gang, and Is It Legal?.

Ashforde played Sonia Fowler's lawyer Adam Childe in EastEnders in 2007. He also played the character of Darren in Is It Legal?, the hotel porter in Mr. Bean in Room 426, Abi Harper's boyfriend in the My Family episode "Imperfect Strangers", and Zane in the 2001 The Tomorrow People audio drama, The New Gods.

As well as this, he has also been on CBBC's television adaptation of Jacqueline Wilson's Hetty Feather as a member of the regular cast, playing character Mr Cranbourne.
 
Ashforde has also appeared in the BBC Two comedy series Never Better, Channel 4's comedy series Drop The Dead Donkey and is also recognisable as the biker in the McDonald's adverts in the late 1990s.

References

External links

English male television actors
Year of birth missing (living people)
Living people
20th-century English male actors
21st-century English male actors